Kōjiro Station may refer to:
Kōjiro Station (Yamaguchi) in Iwakuni, Yamaguchi, Japan
Kōjiro Station (Nagasaki) in Unzen, Nagasaki, Japan